In A.D. 60, Emperor Ming of the Eastern Han dynasty honored 28 founding generals of the dynasty, who had served his father Emperor Guangwu, by painting their portraits on the Cloud Terrace (Yuntai) of the South Palace in the capital Luoyang. They became known as the  twenty-eight generals of the Cloud Terrace (or Yuntai) (雲台二十八將).

One criterion Emperor Ming used for his selection was that the men honored must not be relatives of the imperial family. Thus, Ma Yuan (whose daughter was Emperor Ming's empress) and Lai Xi (来歙, Emperor Guangwu's uncle-in-law) were not selected, despite their great contributions.

Unusual in Chinese history, the 28 generals all had natural deaths or died while in service to Emperor Guangwu. Guangwu himself was lauded for his trust of these men who helped him forge his empire.

Order
 Deng Yu (鄧禹)
 Wu Han (吳漢)
 Jia Fu (賈復)
 Geng Yan (耿弇)
 Kou Xun (寇恂)
 Cen Peng (岑彭)
 Feng Yi (馮異)
 Zhu Hu (朱祜)
 Zhai Zun (祭遵)
 Jing Dan (景丹)
 Ge Yan  (蓋延)
 Yao Qi (銚期)
 Geng Chun (耿純)
 Zang Gong (臧宮)
 Ma Wu (馬武)
 Liu Long (劉隆)
 Ma Cheng (馬成)
 Wang Liang (王梁)
 Chen Jun (陳俊)
 Du Mao (杜茂)
 Fu Jun (傅俊)
 Jian Tan (堅鐔)
 Wang Ba (王覇)
 Ren Guang (任光)
 Li Zhong (李忠)
 Wan Xiu (萬脩)
 Pi Tong (邳彤)
 Liu Zhi (劉植)

Other honorees
In addition to the 28 generals, Emperor Ming hung the portraits of four other men in the Cloud Terrace. They are:
 Wang Chang (王常)
 Li Tong (李通); Li was also Emperor Ming's uncle-in-law as his wife is Emperor Ming's aunt (and Emperor Guangwu's sister) Liu Boji.
 Dou Rong (窦融)
 Zhuo Mao (卓茂)

See also
Lingyan Pavilion, where Tang emperors from Taizong onwards honored officials in a similar manner.

References 

 Zizhi Tongjian by Sima Guang, vols. 38-44 (original available here), and Modern Chinese Edition, edited by Bo Yang (Taipei, 1982–1989).

Han dynasty generals
Sets of portraits
Chinese paintings
1st-century works